John William Logan  (1845 – 25 May 1925), known as Paddy Logan, was a civil engineering contractor and Liberal Member of Parliament (MP) for Harborough in Leicestershire.

He was the son of John Logan of Newport, Monmouthshire and educated at King's School, Gloucester. J. W. Logan was a successful railway contractor with the civil engineering firm of Logan and Hemingway. He moved to Leicestershire in 1876 to supervise a railway contract and lived near Market Harborough at East Langton Grange, where he gave the village a cricket ground and a hall. He also maintained a cottage home for the children of men killed on his works.

His health was poor following a hunting accident and he resigned as MP on two occasions. Logan had won Harborough from the Tories at a by-election on 8 May 1891 and held it until his resignation on 1 June 1904. He returned at the second general election of 1910, only to resign again six years later. His political career was devoted to improving the lot of agricultural labourers, and it was in their interests that he had agreed to stand for parliament on the second occasion, but the strain proved too great, forcing him to retire permanently from public life.

During his election campaigns, he was often denied the use of public halls and held his meetings under canvas in what he called the "free speech tent".

He has the distinction to have been appointed as both Steward of the Manor of Northstead and Steward of the Chiltern Hundreds. He was appointed to the former post in 1904 and to the latter in 1916. The Stewards of the Manor of Northstead and of the Chiltern Hundreds are notional 'offices of profit under the crown' which are used a procedural device to enable MPs to resign.

J. W. Logan was a prominent sportsman and one of the founding fathers of the British racing pigeon fancy, writing Logan’s Pigeon Racer’s Handbook. He was president of Leicestershire County Cricket Club and his son, Hugh, played a single first-class cricket match for Leicestershire.

On his death at the age of 80 in 1925, he was buried at East Langton, where he had lived for 50 years. During his life he also visited Australia and New Zealand.

Logan Street in Market Harborough and the electoral ward of Market Harborough Logan in Harborough District is named after him.

References

External links 
 

1845 births
1925 deaths
Liberal Party (UK) MPs for English constituencies
UK MPs 1886–1892
UK MPs 1892–1895
UK MPs 1895–1900
UK MPs 1900–1906
UK MPs 1910–1918
People from Harborough District
People educated at the King's School, Gloucester